Lieutenant-Colonel Charles Kenneth Howard-Bury DSO, DL, JP (15 August 188120 September 1963) was a British-Irish soldier, explorer, botanist and Conservative politician.

Background and education

A member of the Howard family, he was born at Charleville Castle, King's County, Ireland, the only son of Captain Kenneth Howard-Bury (1846–1885), son of the Honourable James Howard. His mother was Lady Emily Alfreda Julia, daughter of Charles Bury, 3rd Earl of Charleville. His father had assumed the additional surname of Bury in 1881 after his wife succeeded to the Charleville estates. In his own right he succeeded to the estates of Charles Brinsley Marlay. He was educated at Eton and the Royal Military College, Sandhurst.

Career until 1921

Howard-Bury was always interested in climbing as a youth, which led him to take up the larger routes in Austrian Alps. He joined the King's Royal Rifle Corps in 1904 and was posted to India, where he went travelling and big game-hunting. In 1905, he secretly entered Tibet without permission and was rebuked by Lord Curzon. His early travel diaries date from 1906 and show his keen powers of observation, encyclopaedic knowledge of natural history, and linguistic ability. At the beginning of World War I, Howard-Bury rejoined his regiment and served with distinction as a frontline officer on the Somme and throughout the conflict. He was captured during the German Spring Offensive of 1918, and then made a dramatic escape from his prisoner-of-war camp, before being recaptured ten days later.

1921 Mount Everest Reconnaissance Expedition

At the behest or Sir Francis Younghusband in 1920, Howard-Bury successfully paved the way for the Everest Expedition. In 1921 he was the leader of the Mount Everest Reconnaissance Expedition, organised and financed by the Mount Everest Committee, a joint body of the Alpine Club and the Royal Geographical Society. In 1922 he wrote a full account of the expedition, published as "Mount Everest The Reconnaissance, 1921".

During the 1921 expedition, Howard-Bury found many footprints at high altitude; he later pronounced that the tracks "were probably caused by a large 'loping' grey wolf", however his sherpas were quick to offer that they were the tracks of a "metch kangmi" (meaning "filthy snowman"). It was at this time that Henry Newman of The Statesman in Calcutta (now Kolkata) obtained descriptions from the expedition's porters on their return to Darjeeling. Bill Tilman has claimed that Newman mistranslated "metch kangmi" as "abominable snowman", hence the phrase "Abominable Snowman" came into existence in 1921.

Later Newman wrote in a letter to The Times "The whole story seemed such a joyous creation I sent it to one or two newspapers". Izzard adds "whatever effect Mr. Newman intended, from 1921 onwards the Yeti – or whatever various native populations choose to call it – became saddled with the description "Abominable Snowman", an appellation which can only appeal more to the music-hall mind than to mammologists, a fact which has seriously handicapped earnest seekers of the truth"

He was awarded the 1922 Founder's Medal of the Royal Geographical Society for his leadership of the expedition.

Political career

The Everest expedition of 1921 made Howard-Bury a public figure, and in 1922 he was elected to parliament for Bilston as Conservative. He lost his seat in 1924 but returned to the House of Commons in 1926, when he was elected for Chelmsford. He resigned in 1931. He was also a deputy lieutenant and justice of the peace for County Westmeath.

Personal life

Howard-Bury died on 20 September 1963, aged 82. He never married. He left his house at Belvedere to his friend Rex Beaumont.

Legacy

In 2013, British adventurers Matthew Traver and Jamie Bunchuk completed a 750-mile horse ride down the post roads of Eastern Kazakhstan in honour of the centenary of Howard-Bury's travels through the region, en route to the Tian Shan mountains in 1913.

Arms

References

 C. K. Howard-Bury, "Mount Everest The Reconnaissance, 1921"
 Charles Howard-Bury, edited by Marian Keaney, "Mountains of Heaven: Travels in the Tien Shan Mountains, 1913"

External links

 
 
 The Royal Geographical Society
 

King's Royal Rifle Corps officers
British Army personnel of World War I
English botanists
English explorers
Conservative Party (UK) MPs for English constituencies
Sportspeople from London
UK MPs 1922–1923
UK MPs 1923–1924
UK MPs 1929–1931
English mountain climbers
World War I prisoners of war held by Germany
Graduates of the Royal Military College, Sandhurst
Charles
1880s births
1963 deaths
British World War I prisoners of war
People educated at Eton College
Irish soldiers in the British Army